The Mt. Carmel Monastery is a historic monastery located at Port Tobacco, Charles County, Maryland, United States. It is a two-part frame house, the main block of which was built about 1790 and restored in 1936–37. It consists of a two-story structure with a moderately pitched gable roof. The entire house, devoid of any extraneous ornamentation, reflects the austere lives of the Carmelite nuns who are believed to have used this house as their residence. 

The monastery was founded on October 15, 1790, by four English-speaking Carmelite nuns from what is now Belgium, among them Ann Teresa Mathews; three were born in Charles County. The fourth nun was Frances Dickinson from London. Like thousands of English Roman Catholic girls who wanted to be nuns, Dickinson had traveled to Belgium to enter a convent there, as none was left in England.  Dickinson would the first prioress until her death in 1830.

In 1831 the nuns then in residence were ordered by the bishop to transfer the convent to Baltimore, Maryland. This property in Port Tobacco was abandoned. In 1933 an organization called the Restorers of Mt. Carmel in Maryland formed to aid in the restoration of the site.

The Mt. Carmel Monastery was listed on the National Register of Historic Places in 1973.

References

External links

, including photo from 1969, at Maryland Historical Trust
Restorers of Mount Carmel in Maryland
"Mesmerized by Mt. Carmel Monastery, Port Tobacco, Maryland," Southern Maryland Living
Discalced Nuns of the Carmel of Port Tobacco

Belgian-American history
Houses in Charles County, Maryland
Houses on the National Register of Historic Places in Maryland
Houses completed in 1790
Carmelite monasteries in the United States
National Register of Historic Places in Charles County, Maryland